Tactusa rima is a moth of the family Erebidae first described by Michael Fibiger in 2010. It is known from northern Vietnam.

The wingspan is about 12 mm. The ground colour of the forewing is light yellow, suffused with brown patches and lines. The dorsal part of the antemedial and postmedial lines is brown, subterminal pale and margined proximally by blackish patches, all extending weakly to the costa. The terminal line is marked by interneural black spots. The hindwing is dark grey, with an indistinct discal spot and the underside is unicolorous grey.

References

Micronoctuini
Taxa named by Michael Fibiger
Moths described in 2010